China Tibet Broadcasting (CTB) is a broadcast network headquartered in Lhasa, Tibet Autonomous Region of the People's Republic of China. Its radio programmes were founded in 1959. Its English language audio broadcast is called Holy Tibet, broadcasts at 07:00 and 16:00 UTC every day.

The official website is "Voice of Tibet". It comprises the CTB with and Tibet Television (XZTV).

Broadcast time
Standard Chinese: 4:00 (Wednesday 5:00)–2:00 (next day)
Standard Tibatan: 4:50 (Wednesday 5:00)–2:00 (next day)
Kham Tibetan language: 6:00–0:00 (next day)
City life: 6:50–2:00 (next day)
Educational: 7:30–13:30 and 18:00–22:00

See also
 Voice of Tibet (Norway)

External links
  (in Mandarin)
  
 Directory of FM radio stations in the region Xizang

Television networks in China
Mass media in Lhasa
Tibetan-language radio stations
Television in minority languages